This article lists events that occurred during 1996 in Estonia.

Incumbents
President - Lennart Meri
Prime Minister - Tiit Vähi

Events

Births
9 May - Saron Läänmäe, footballer

Deaths
30 May - Alo Mattiisen, composer (born 1961)
10 July - Eno Raud, children's writer (born 1928)

See also
 1996 in Estonian football
 1996 in Estonian television

References

 
1990s in Estonia
Estonia
Estonia
Years of the 20th century in Estonia